Jaswick Ossie Taylor (3 January 1932 – 13 November 1999) was a West Indian cricketer who played in three Tests from 1958 to 1959. On his debut, he took five wickets in the first innings against Pakistan in Port of Spain.

See also
 List of West Indies cricketers who have taken five-wicket hauls on Test debut

References

External links
 

1932 births
1999 deaths
West Indies Test cricketers
Cricketers from Port of Spain
Trinidad and Tobago cricketers
Cricketers who have taken five wickets on Test debut